Inger Miller (born June 12, 1972) is a retired American track and field sprinter who competed in the 100 metres and 200 m. She is the daughter of Lennox Miller, an Olympic champion runner from Jamaica.

She attended John Muir High School in Pasadena, California and later the University of Southern California. Miller was a Tournament of Roses Princess in the 1990 court. During her professional career she was a member of HSI.

She originally won the bronze medal in the 60 meters at the 1999 IAAF World Indoor Championships, but she tested positive for excessive caffeine after the race. Her results from the tournament were nullified and she received a public warning.

She was 1999 World 200 m champion; 1999 World Champs 100 m silver medalist; 1996 Olympic 4 × 100 m relay gold medalist; 4 × 100 m relay gold medalist at 1997 World Champs; 2003 World Outdoor 4 × 100 m silver medalist.

Together with Jill Hawkins, Miller started Miller-Hawkins Productions, a full-service event coordinating company. The company currently operates out of offices in Altadena.

As of 2019 Miller was working as a flight attendant.

References 

 Inger Miller profile at USATF

1972 births
Living people
American people of Jamaican descent
American female sprinters
Doping cases in athletics
American sportspeople in doping cases
Olympic gold medalists for the United States in track and field
Athletes (track and field) at the 1991 Pan American Games
Athletes (track and field) at the 1996 Summer Olympics
University of Southern California alumni
African-American female track and field athletes
World Athletics Championships medalists
Track and field athletes from Los Angeles
Medalists at the 1996 Summer Olympics
Universiade medalists in athletics (track and field)
Goodwill Games medalists in athletics
Universiade gold medalists for the United States
USA Outdoor Track and Field Championships winners
World Athletics Championships winners
Medalists at the 1995 Summer Universiade
USC Trojans women's track and field athletes
Competitors at the 1998 Goodwill Games
Competitors at the 2001 Goodwill Games
Pan American Games track and field athletes for the United States
Olympic female sprinters
21st-century African-American sportspeople
21st-century African-American women
20th-century African-American sportspeople
20th-century African-American women